Wiseblood is the second studio album by the British rock band King Swamp.  Originally released in September 1990, the album was panned by the critics.  When the album failed to chart anywhere in the U.S. or the U.K., the band split up.

Track listing

U.S. Release
 "Wiseblood" – 4:13
 "One Step Over the Line" – 4:38
 "Floating World" – 4:14
 "Walk the Knife" – 4:21
 "Can’t Be Satisfied" – 5:07
 "Nightfall Over Eden" – 5:43
 "Walk on Gilded Splinters" – 4:45
 "Some Kind of Love" – 4:35
 "Kiss the Sun" – 4:44
 "Wiseblood (Original Mix)" – 4:00

U.K. Release
 "Wiseblood" – 4:01
 "One Step Over the Line" – 4:38
 "Floating World" – 4:14
 "Walk the Knife" – 4:21
 "Can’t Be Satisfied" – 5:07
 "Nightfall Over Eden" – 5:43
 "Walk on Gilded Splinters" – 4:45
 "Redemption Day" – 4:55
 "Some Kind of Love" – 4:35
 "Kiss the Sun" – 4:44

Personnel
Walter Wray - lead vocals
Steve Halliwell - additional vocals, keyboards
Dominic Miller - guitar, dobro
Mike Cozzi, Nick Lashley - guitar
Dave Allen - bass guitar
Martyn Barker - drums
Technical
Bob Clearmountain - mixing

References

1990 albums
King Swamp albums
Virgin Records albums